Imad Chhadeh  (born October 12, 1979, Damascus) is a Swedish-Assyrian footballer who currently plays under contract for Swedish side Assyriska.

External links

 Bio
Stats
 Bio
 

1979 births
Living people
Syrian footballers
Syrian expatriate footballers
Syrian Christians
Assyrian emigrants to Sweden
Syrian emigrants to Sweden
Association football midfielders
Åtvidabergs FF players
IF Brommapojkarna players
Assyriska FF players
Allsvenskan players
Superettan players
Swedish people of Assyrian/Syriac descent
Assyrian footballers
Syria international footballers